Transgender Health is a bimonthly peer-reviewed academic journal covering transgender health. It was established in 2016 and is published by Mary Ann Liebert. The editor-in-chief is Robert Garofalo (Northwestern University).

Abstracting and indexing
The journal is abstracted and indexed in PsycINFO, Current Contents/Clinical Medicine, Current Contents/Social and Behavioral Sciences, Science Citation Index Expanded, and the Social Sciences Citation Index. According to the Journal Citation Reports, the journal has a 2021 impact factor of 4.427.

See also

 LGBT Health
 International Journal of Transgender Health
 Transgender Studies Quarterly
 List of transgender publications

References

Further reading

External links

Bimonthly journals
English-language journals
LGBT and health care
LGBT literature in the United States
LGBT-related journals
Mary Ann Liebert academic journals
Publications established in 2016
Transgender and medicine
Transgender literature